The Stomner House or Stanmer House on 3rd St., NE, in Mayville, North Dakota was built in 1896.  It was listed on the National Register of Historic Places in 1979.

It's significant for its architecture and for its association with the Ellertson and Stomner families. It became a contributing property to the Mayville Historic District in 1985.

References

Houses on the National Register of Historic Places in North Dakota
Victorian architecture in North Dakota
Houses completed in 1896
Houses in Traill County, North Dakota
National Register of Historic Places in Traill County, North Dakota
1896 establishments in North Dakota
Individually listed contributing properties to historic districts on the National Register in North Dakota
Mayville, North Dakota